EVA is a Slovak-made self-propelled howitzer, developed by Konstrukta Defence and publicly revealed in 2015. The EVA is based on a Tatra 815 6x6 truck, but the system can be also mounted on a 8x8 truck chassis.

Design
Created as a shared project between Konstrukta Defense and ZTS Special, using technology developed for SpGH Zuzana 2. Utilizes a 155mm gun, 52-caliber, achieving a range of up to  using specialized ERFB-BB munition. Firing rate is stated as up to 5 rounds in the first minute, and 13 rounds in 3 minutes. Carries 24 rounds in automatic magazines ready to fire. The operation is fully automated and can be performed from the inside of the armored cabin. Multiple round simultaneous impact firing mode is supported and the howitzer can be connected to command and control system of a battalion battery.

High mobility is achieved by using Tatra 815 6x6 chassis, however the developer states that there is an option for 8x8. Dimensions and weight were kept under the limits of C-130, achieving high strategic mobility for the system. 

Compared to competing designs of similar concept, EVA offers compact design, low weight and high range, ability to be transported using C-130 planes, as well as full automation of the firing with minimal crew needed.

Future operators
 
According to the Institute of Central Europe, Malaysia intends to buy 16-19 EVA SpGH

See also

Archer
DRDO ATAGS
ATMOS 2000
A-222 Bereg
2S22 Bohdana
CAESAR
DANA
G6 Rhino
AHS Kryl
Nora B-52
PCL-09
PCL-161
PCL-181
PLL-09
Type 19 
ZUZANA
List of artillery

References

Self-propelled artillery of Slovakia
Science and technology in Slovakia
155 mm artillery
Wheeled self-propelled howitzers